The 2022–23 season is the 53rd season in the existence of FC Utrecht and the club's 53rd consecutive season in the top flight of Dutch football. In addition to the domestic league, FC Utrecht participated in this season's editions of the KNVB Cup.

Players

First-team squad

Transfers

Summer

Transfers in

Transfers out

Winter

Transfers in

Transfers out

Pre-season and friendlies

Competitions

Overall record

Eredivisie

League table

Results summary

Results by round

Matches 
The league fixtures were announced on 17 June 2022.

KNVB Cup

Statistics

Goalscorers 
Friendlies

Assists

Monthly Awards

Attendance

Home games

Away supporters

References

External links
 

FC Utrecht seasons
FC Utrecht